Women's Giant Slalom World Cup 2004/2005

Final point standings

In Women's Giant Slalom World Cup 2004/05 all results count.

 Note: In the last race only the best racers were allowed to compete and only the best 15 finishers were awarded with points.

World Cup
FIS Alpine Ski World Cup women's giant slalom discipline titles